Greg Kraft (born April 4, 1964) is an American professional golfer who has played on the Nationwide Tour and the PGA Tour.

Kraft was born in Detroit, Michigan. He graduated from the University of Tampa in 1986 and turned professional later that year. He played on the Nationwide Tour in 1990, 1991, and 2005; and on the PGA Tour from 1992 to 2004, and 2006 to 2010. He has one win on each tour.

In 2003, he received media attention when he sued the PGA Tour alleging they failed to properly warn golfers of the possibility of contracting Coccidiomycosis (valley fever). The lawsuit was eventually dismissed.

In 2008, Kraft won the inaugural Puerto Rico Open in his 379th PGA Tour start. His last PGA Tour event was the 2011 Puerto Rico Open. Upon turning 50, Kraft joined the Champions Tour.

Professional wins (3)

PGA Tour wins (1)

Nationwide Tour wins (1)

Other wins (1)

Results in major championships

Note: Kraft never played in the Masters Tournament.

CUT = missed the half-way cut
"T" = tied

Results in The Players Championship

CUT = missed the halfway cut
"T" indicates a tie for a place

Results in World Golf Championships

1Cancelled due to 9/11

QF, R16, R32, R64 = Round in which player lost in match play
NT = No tournament

See also
1991 PGA Tour Qualifying School graduates
1992 PGA Tour Qualifying School graduates
1995 PGA Tour Qualifying School graduates
2005 PGA Tour Qualifying School graduates

References

External links

American male golfers
PGA Tour golfers
PGA Tour Champions golfers
Golfers from Detroit
Golfers from Florida
University of Tampa alumni
Sportspeople from Clearwater, Florida
1964 births
Living people